The City of Waverley was a local government area about  east-southeast of Melbourne, the state capital of Victoria, Australia.

History

Waverley was first incorporated as the Oakleigh Road District in January 1857, which became the Shire of Oakleigh in December 1871. Parts of the Central and South Ridings were severed to create the Oakleigh Borough, which went on to become the City of Oakleigh on 13 March 1891. The remainder was renamed the Shire of Mulgrave on 19 February 1897. In 1949 and 1959, further areas were annexed to the City of Oakleigh. On 14 April 1961, the Shire of Mulgrave became the City of Waverley.

On 15 December 1994, the City of Waverley was abolished, and along with parts of the City of Oakleigh, was merged into the newly created City of Monash.

Council meetings were held at Waverley Town Hall, on Springvale Road, Glen Waverley. It presently serves as the council seat for the City of Monash.

Wards

The City of Waverley was subdivided into four wards on 31 May 1971, each electing three councillors:
 West Ward
 Centre Ward
 East Ward
 South Ward

Suburbs
 Ashwood
 Burwood (shared with the Cities of Box Hill and Camberwell)
 Glen Waverley*
 Jordanville
 Mount Waverley
 Mulgrave
 Notting Hill
 Wheelers Hill

* Council seat.

Population

* Estimate in the 1958 Victorian Year Book.

References

External links
 Victorian Places - Waverley

Waverley
1857 establishments in Australia
City of Monash
1994 disestablishments in Australia